KIZZ (93.7 FM) is a top 40 (CHR) radio station located in Minot, North Dakota owned by iHeartMedia, Z94 airs the syndicated Bob and Sheri morning show and along with weekend programs such as American Top 40, Dawson McAllister Live,  and Hollywood Hamilton.

iHeartMedia also owns and operates KCJB 910 (country/talk), KRRZ 1390 (classic hits/talk), KYYX 97.1 (country), KMXA-FM 99.9 (adult contemporary), and KZPR 105.3 (mainstream rock) in Minot.

The same call letters were assigned in the 1960s to an AM sunlight-only radio station in El Paso, Texas, an early entrant in the category of conservative talk radio stations.

Z94 debuted in 1978 after being KMOT-FM. It switched from top 40 to hot adult contemporary in 1992 and returned to top 40 by 1998.

References

External links

IZZ
Contemporary hit radio stations in the United States
Radio stations established in 1968
1968 establishments in North Dakota
IHeartMedia radio stations